The Kuwait Army, established in 1949, is the oldest armed branch among the military of Kuwait. Its cavalry and infantry predecessors operated in desert and metropolitan areas in 1919, 1920 and 1928 to 1938, tracing their roots directly to the cavalrymen and infantrymen that defended Al-Kout Fortress since the 19th century along with various mounted defensive forces. The "Kuwait Army" was later established as the Kuwait Land Force, which became the principal land force of the Kuwait Armed Forces.

History 

The Kuwait Army was created in 1949 by Field Marshal Sheikh Abdullah Mubarak Al-Sabah (1949–1961) during the time when its partnership was included part of the Directorate of Public Security Force in 1938 prior to splitting in 1953. As Sheikh Abdullah Mubarak Al-Sabah headed the Directorate of Public Security Force which included the Kuwait Army; the later, was headed by deputy commander Colonel Mubarak Abdullah Al-Jaber Al-Sabah.

In 1990 and 1991, during the first Gulf War, most of the equipment was seized and or destroyed by invading Iraqi forces. At that time the Kuwait military was a lot smaller.

Structure and organization 
 Kuwait 6th Liberation Mechanized Brigade
 Kuwait 15th Mubarak Armored Brigade
 Kuwait 26th Al-Soor Mechanized Brigade
 Kuwait 35th Shahid (Martyr) Armored Brigade
 Kuwait 94th Saleh Al-Mohammed Mechanized Brigade
 Kuwait 25th Commando Brigade (Independent)
 Kuwait Emiri Guard Authority (Independent)
 Kuwait Military Police Authority (Independent)
 Kuwait Military Fire Service Directorate

Equipment

Armored fighting vehicles

Logistics and utility vehicles

Self-propelled field artillery 

Multiple launch rocket systems

Anti-tank

Firearms

Kuwait Army Ranks 
His Highness, the Emir of Kuwait: Commander-in-chief of the Military of Kuwait

His Highness, the Crown Prince of Kuwait: Deputy Commander-in-Chief of the Military of Kuwait

Commissioned Officers

Enlisted

See also 
 Chief of the General Staff (Kuwait)hhh

References

External links 
 UNIKOM
 Kuwaiti Army Equipment

Military units and formations established in 1948
Military of Kuwait
Armies by country